Alapati Lui Mataeliga (born 4 January 1953) is the Roman Catholic Archbishop of Samoa-Apia and Ecclesiastical Superior of the Mission sui iuris of Tokelau. He was born in Sataua on the island of Savai'i.  He was ordained for the presbyterate of the Diocese of Samoa and Tokelau on July 5, 1977. Upon the retirement of Cardinal Pio Taofinu'u, Father Mataeliga was appointed by the Holy See as the second Archbishop of Samoa-Apia on November 16, 2002. He was consecrated to the episcopate and installed as ordinary by Archbishop Patrick Coveney, Apostolic Nuncio to Samoa, on January 3, 2003.

On 31 May 2021, during the 2021 Samoan constitutional crisis, Alapati denounced caretaker prime minister Tuilaepa Aiono Sailele Malielegaoi for ignoring the courts and refusing to yield power. In the aftermath of the crisis, when the FAST government was refusing to allow opposition MPs to be sworn into parliament, Alapati performed an ifoga outside the Legislative Assembly of Samoa in order to seek peace.

See also 

 Catholic Church hierarchy
 List of Catholic dioceses in South Pacific Conference states
 Lists of patriarchs, archbishops, and bishops

References

External links

 Roman Catholic Archdiocese of Samoa-Apia Official Site
Catholic Hierarchy Biography of Archbishop Mataeliga

Samoan Roman Catholic archbishops
21st-century Roman Catholic archbishops in Oceania
People from Vaisigano
1953 births
Living people
Roman Catholic archbishops of Samoa–Apia